Payena kapitensis is a tree in the family Sapotaceae. The bark is dark brown. Inflorescences bear up to four flowers. The tree is named for Kapit in Malaysia's Sarawak state. Its habitat is mixed dipterocarp forests. P. kapitensis is endemic to Borneo and known only from Sarawak.

References

kapitensis
Endemic flora of Borneo
Trees of Borneo
Flora of Sarawak
Plants described in 1997